Bharal is a village in District Bagpat in Uttar Pradesh, India. It has population about 10000. Pin code of the area is 250622. Near by police station is in Doghat. This village is one of four villages group called Chaugama. Other villages are Daha, Nirpura and Gahandpura or Gaidabra. It is Rana Jats dominating village.

Villages in Bagpat district